Diceroprocta cinctifera is a species of cicada in the family Cicadidae. It is found in North America.

Subspecies
These three subspecies belong to the species Diceroprocta cinctifera:
 Diceroprocta cinctifera cinctifera (Uhler, 1892)
 Diceroprocta cinctifera limpia Davis, 1932
 Diceroprocta cinctifera viridicosta Davis, 1930

References

Further reading

 
 

Articles created by Qbugbot
Insects described in 1892
Fidicinini